Dina El Bitar (born ) is an  Egyptian female volleyball player, playing as an outside hitter. She was part of the Egypt women's national volleyball team. She won the gold medal at the 2011 Pan Arab Games. On club level, she played for El Shams Club in 2011.

References

Further reading 
 Worldofvolley.com profile
 FIVB Volleyball Photo

1990 births
Living people
Egyptian women's volleyball players
Place of birth missing (living people)